Vassallo or Vasallo is a surname of Italian and Spanish origin. It is a common surname in Malta. Notable people with the surname include:

Andrea Vassallo (architect)
Andrea Vassallo (footballer) (born 1997), Italian footballer
Ángel Daniel Vassallo (born 1986), Puerto Rican basketball player
Angelo Vassallo (1953–2010), Italian politician
Antonio Maria Vassallo (c. 1620–1664/1673), Italian Baroque painter
Barrie Vassallo (born 1956), Welsh footballer
Francisco Vassallo (1789–1849), Puerto Rican mayor
Ġan Anton Vassallo (1817–1868) Maltese writer, poet and academic
Gustavo Vassallo (born 1978), Peruvian footballer
Gustavo Vassallo (fencer) (born 1920), Argentine fencer
Harry Vassallo, Maltese politician
Italo Vassallo (1940–2021), Italian-Eritrean footballer
Jesse Vassallo (born 1961), Puerto Rican swimmer
Joseph Vassallo (born 1964), American actor
Luciano Vassallo (born 1935), former footballer of Eritrean and Italian origin
Martín Vassallo Argüello (born 1980), Argentine tennis player
Nicla Vassallo (born 1963), Italian philosopher and writer
Salvador Vassallo (businessman) (1942–2007), Puerto Rican businessman
Salvador Vassallo (swimmer) (born 1968), Puerto Rican swimmer
Víctor Vassallo (born 1960), Puerto Rican businessman, athlete, and politician

See also
Industrias Vassallo, Puerto Rican manufacturing company